The List of shipwrecks in 1753 includes some ships sunk, wrecked or otherwise lost during 1753.

January

10 January

12 January

30 January

Unknown date

February

14 February

15 February

Unknown date

March
4 March

8 March

12 March

15 March

25 March

26 March

Unknown date

April

7 April

20 April

26 April

Unknown date

May

9 May

Unknown date

June

3 June

6 June

July

Unknown date

August

5 August

20 August

September

3 September

Unknown date

October

2 October

3 October

12 October

22 October

Unknown date

November

8 November

15 November

Unknown date

December

4 December

12 December

13 December

14 December

19 December

Unknown date

Unknown date

References

1753